The first Werkbund Exhibition of 1914 was held at Rheinpark in Cologne, Germany. Bruno Taut's best-known building, the prismatic dome of the Glass Pavilion of which only black and white images survive today, was in reality a brightly colored landmark. Walter Gropius and Adolf Meyer designed a model factory for the exhibition. The Belgian architect Henri van de Velde designed a model theatre. Berlin-based Margarete Knuppelholz-Roeser designed the controversial Haus Der Frau.

The exhibition happened mainly on the initiative of the later German chancellor Konrad Adenauer, then a 36-year-old aspiring inventor, Werkbund member and local politician at Cologne. The city spent the luxurious sum of 5 million Goldmarks (equivalent to  million  €) on the event. Planning began in earnest in 1912, and construction work started in early 1914. The exhibition was opened to the public by Van de Velde on 15 May 1914. Scheduled to last until the end of October, it was prematurely shut down on 8 August following the outbreak of World War I a week earlier; the exhibition buildings were dismantled shortly afterwards.

There were two more Werkbund Exhibitions after the war. The second was the Stuttgart Exhibition of 1927, which included the Weissenhof Estate. At that time, the third Werkbund Exhibition had been tentatively scheduled for 1937, but the plan was shelved in 1932 because of the Great Depression and could not be taken up again since the Nazis opposed and ultimately outlawed the Werkbund. It finally took place on a reduced scale in 1949, back in Cologne, and turned out to be the last Werkbund Exhibition.

See also
Expressionism
Deutscher Werkbund

External links
 

Expressionist architecture
1914
Modernist architecture in Germany
1914 in Germany
Culture in Cologne
Walter Gropius